Han Jin-seop (born September 7, 1981) is a South Korean sport shooter. He has twice represented his country at the Olympics.

At the 2008 Summer Olympics, he finished 26th in the Men's 10 metre air rifle and 15th in the Men's 50 metre rifle 3 positions.

He competed at the 2012 Summer Olympics in the Men's 10 metre air rifle finishing in 32nd place, 9th in the Men's 50 metre rifle 3 positions and 6th in the Men's 50 metre rifle prone.

References

External links

South Korean male sport shooters
Living people
Olympic shooters of South Korea
Shooters at the 2008 Summer Olympics
Shooters at the 2012 Summer Olympics
Asian Games medalists in shooting
Shooters at the 2010 Asian Games
1981 births
Shooters at the 2014 Asian Games
Asian Games gold medalists for South Korea
Asian Games silver medalists for South Korea
Medalists at the 2010 Asian Games
Medalists at the 2014 Asian Games
20th-century South Korean people
21st-century South Korean people